Chopaka Mountain, also known as Mount Chopaka, is a summit in the leeward flank of the North Cascades.  Its summit area is a Natural Area Preserve comprising , and features a mountain goat population and various rare plants.  The last surviving native herd of bighorn sheep in Washington was located on Chopaka Mountain until hunted out in the 1920s.

Name origin
According to the British Columbia Geographical Names Information System, in their record on nearby Chopaka, British Columbia, Chopaka was either an Okanagan hunter turned to stone by "coyote", or a maiden transformed into stone.  Another meaning is given by regional climbing guide author Fred Beckey who states that Chopaka is an Indian word meaning "high mountain".

See also
 Chopaka Lake

References

External links
 

Mountains of Washington (state)
North Cascades of Washington (state)
Mountains of Okanogan County, Washington
Washington Natural Areas Program
Protected areas of Okanogan County, Washington